Andy Ross (1940-2006) was an international speedway rider from Scotland.

Speedway career 
Ross was a finalist at the Individual Ice Speedway World Championship in the 1969 Individual Ice Speedway World Championship and the 1970 Individual Ice Speedway World Championship.

He rode in the British League of British Speedway from 19697 to 1971 and was the first captain of the Peterbrough Panthers.

He died in a shooting accident in Scotland on 3 September 2006.

World final appearances

Individual Ice Speedway World Championship
1969 -  Inzell, 11th - 5pts
1970 -  Nässjö, 7th - 9pts

References 

1940 births
2006 deaths
British speedway riders
Scottish speedway riders
Oxford Cheetahs riders
Peterborough Panthers riders
Rayleigh Rockets riders